David Weston (born 28 July 1938) is an English actor, director and author. Since graduating from the Royal Academy of Dramatic Art (RADA) in 1961 (having won its Silver Medal for that year) he has acted in numerous film, television and stage productions, including twenty-seven Shakespeare plays and prominent guest roles in two Doctor Who serials. With Michael Croft, he was a founder member of the National Youth Theatre. Much of his directing work has been for that organisation; he has directed also at the Regent's Park Open Air Theatre and a number of other theatres in London. He wrote and narrated a series of non-fiction audio books, including Shakespeare His Life and Work, which won the 2001 Benjamin Franklin Award for best audio non-fiction book.

Early career
Weston was born in London and educated at Alleyn's School, Dulwich, during the time that Michael Croft, founder of the National Youth Theatre (NYT), worked there. In 1956, Croft directed a school production of Shakespeare's Henry IV, Part 2 which, when revived as a NYT production at the Toynbee Hall Theatre the following year, attracted the attention of the national press. Weston played Falstaff, a character singled out by The Times in its praise of the play's comedy.

In August 1960, Weston played Mark Antony in Shakespeare's Julius Caesar at the Queen's Theatre, Shaftesbury Avenue. Directed by Croft and given in modern dress, this was only the second appearance by the company of the NYT in London's West End. John Shrapnel played Caesar, Neil Stacy Brutus, and Alan Allkins Cassius. The play was judged a "youthful success" by the theatre critic of The Times; Weston's performance was said to have successfully caught an opportunist spirit effectually hidden by a rough charm.

The Times was more muted in its praise of the Electra and Oedipus Rex of Sophocles in a double bill put on by the Royal Academy of Dramatic Art (RADA) at its Vanbrugh Theatre in Bloomsbury in February 1961. Weston played Creon in Oedipus Rex; his bluff characterisation was described as strongly supportive.

His first television appearance was as Romeo in a production for schools of Shakespeare's Romeo and Juliet; Jane Asher played Juliet.

Weston later appeared in the serial Warriors' Gate in the 1981 season of Doctor Who in the pivotal role of the time-sensitive Biroc.

Writing
In 2011 Weston published Covering McKellen: An Understudy's Tale, a memoir of the year he spent as Ian McKellen's understudy in the Royal Shakespeare Company's tour of King Lear directed by Sir Trevor Nunn.

In 2014 Weston published Covering Shakespeare: An Actor's Saga of Near Misses and Dogged Endurance, a memoir of his experiences performing in productions of Shakespeare's plays.

Filmography
 They Hanged My Saintly Billy (1962) - Timmis
 That Kind of Girl (1963) - Keith Murray
 Doctor In Distress (1963) - Dr Stewart
 80,000 Suspects (1963) - Brian Davis (uncredited)
 The Informers (1963) – Young constable (uncredited)
 Witchcraft (1964) – Todd Lanier
 Becket (1964) – Brother John
 The Masque of The Red Death (1964) – Gino
 The Beauty Jungle (1964) – Harry
 The Heroes of Telemark (1965) – Arne
 The Legend of Young Dick Turpin (1966) – Dick Turpin
 The Winter's Tale (1968) – Florizel / Archidamas
 The Red Baron (1971) – Murphy
 Quest for Love (1971) – Johnny Prescott
 Nobody Ordered Love (1972) – Jacques Legrand
 King Lear (TV film) 1982 - Duke of Burgundy
 King Lear (2008) – Gentleman
 Masterpiece (2010) – Suit on TV 1

References

External links
 David Weston's website
 

English male film actors
English male stage actors
English male television actors
English male Shakespearean actors
1938 births
Living people
Male actors from London
Alumni of RADA
People educated at Alleyn's School
National Youth Theatre members